Rafael Tavares Gomes Fernandes (born 28 June 2002) is a Portuguese professional footballer who plays as a centre-back for Arouca.

Professional career
A youth product of Sporting CP since 2010, he started playing with their reserves in the 2021-22 season. On 11 July 2022, he transferred to Arouca in the Primeira Liga signing a 3-year contract. He made his professional debut as a half-time substitute in a 4–0 Primeira Liga loss to Benfica on 5 August 2022.

International career
Fernandes is a youth international for Portugal, having played for the Portugal U18s and U20s.

References

External links
 
 

2002 births
Living people
Sportspeople from Setúbal
Portuguese footballers
Portugal youth international footballers
Portuguese people of Cape Verdean descent
Sporting CP B players
F.C. Arouca players
Primeira Liga players
Liga Portugal 2 players
Association football defenders